The 2012 BMW Open (also known as The BMW Open by FWU Takaful 2012 for sponsorship reasons) was a men's tennis tournament played on outdoor clay courts. It was the 97th edition of the event. It was part of the ATP World Tour 250 series of the 2012 ATP World Tour. It took place at the MTTC Iphitos complex in Munich, Germany, from 30 April through 6 May 2012. Fourth-seeded Philipp Kohlschreiber won the singles title.

Singles main draw entrants

Seeds

 Seedings are based on the rankings of April 23, 2012

Other entrants
The following players received wildcards into the main draw:
  Michael Berrer
  Daniel Brands
  Tommy Haas

The following players received entry from the qualifying draw:
  Dustin Brown
  Robert Farah
  David Goffin
  Marinko Matosevic

Withdrawals
  Nicolás Almagro
  Thomaz Bellucci
  Radek Štěpánek

Doubles main draw entrants

Seeds

 Rankings are as of April 23, 2012

Other entrants
The following pairs received wildcards into the doubles main draw:
  Daniel Brands /  Kevin Krawietz
  Tommy Haas /  Philipp Petzschner

Finals

Singles

 Philipp Kohlschreiber defeated  Marin Čilić, 7–6(10–8), 6–3
It was Kohlschreiber's 1st title of the year and 4th of his career. It was his 2nd win at Munich, also winning in 2007.

Doubles

 František Čermák /  Filip Polášek defeated  Xavier Malisse /  Dick Norman, 6–4, 7–5

References

External links
Official website

 
2012 BMW Open
BMW Open
April 2012 sports events in Germany
May 2012 sports events in Germany